Hull—Aylmer (formerly known as Hull) is a federal electoral district in Quebec, Canada, that has been represented in the House of Commons of Canada since 1917.

It was created as "Hull"  in 1914 from parts of Labelle and Wright ridings. It was renamed "Hull—Aylmer" in 1984.

It encompasses the parts of the sectors of Hull and Aylmer located in the city of Gatineau, Quebec. The neighbouring ridings are Gatineau, Pontiac, Ottawa West—Nepean, Ottawa Centre, and Ottawa—Vanier.

With its large percentage of civil servants, the riding was a Liberal stronghold for almost a century, and the safest Liberal riding in the province outside Greater Montreal. Even when the rest of the province was turning its back on the Liberals, they survived in Hull—Aylmer in 1984, 2004 and 2006. In 2008, however, it was the only riding in Canada where four candidates received over 15% of the vote, and was the only riding in Quebec outside the Montreal area the Liberals won. In a major turnaround during the 2011 elections, however, the New Democratic Party won the riding as part of its sweep of the Outaouais.  To date, this is the only time the Liberals have lost this riding in an election. The winner of that election, Nycole Turmel, was the interim leader of the NDP from July 28, 2011 until March 24, 2012, following the death of NDP leader Jack Layton. The only other time it was out of Liberal hands was from 1990 to 1993, when Gilles Rocheleau crossed the floor to the Bloc Québécois.

Hull—Aylmer lost territory to Pontiac during the 2012 electoral redistribution. It reverted to form at the 2015 election, when Liberal Greg Fergus handily defeated Turmel as part of the Liberals' clean sweep of the Outaouais.

Political geography
In the 2006 election, only five polls in the Aylmer sector did not vote Liberal. In the Hull sector, the Bloc Québécois performed very well in almost every neighbourhood.  The Bloc's support was the most highly concentrated in the Wrightville, Mont-Bleu and Des Hautes Plaines neighbourhoods of Hull, but they also performed well in Le Plateau, Birch Manor, Jardins-Mackenzie-King, Jardins-Alexandre-Taché, Val-Tétreau, Lac-des-Fées and Ironside. Liberal support was constrained mostly to the neighbourhood of Parc-de-la-Montagne and the Île de Hull which was generally evenly split between the two parties. The Conservatives did not win a single poll in the riding, despite finishing ahead of the NDP which won two in Aylmer. The NDP won a poll in Lakeview Terrace as well as a poll in Parc-Glenwood, where it received less than 25% of the vote, despite winning it.

The strength of the Liberal party in this riding over so many years stems from the federal government influence generally seen in the city of Gatineau. This was the legacy of the federal bilingualism policy of the 1970s (which saw the liberal government of Pierre Trudeau in power) which resulted in the requirement for federal jobs to be distributed on both sides of the river. This was the impetus for the construction of the Portage complex in downtown Hull, which today dominates the commercial sector of the city. A significant number of residents in the riding work for the federal public service, with many working in the federal departments and agencies based in the Place du Portage buildings of downtown Hull. This is in addition to the residents who commute across the bridge to federal jobs in Ottawa.

Members of Parliament

This riding has elected the following Members of Parliament:

Election results

Hull—Aylmer, 1984–present

|align="left" colspan=2|Liberal hold
|align="right"|Swing
|align="right"| +6.04
|align="right"|

Note: Conservative vote is compared to the total of the Canadian Alliance vote and Progressive Conservative vote in the 2000 election.

	

Note: Canadian Alliance vote is compared to the Reform vote in 1999 by-election.

Hull, 1917–1984

Note: Social Credit vote is compared to Ralliement créditiste vote in the 1968 election.

Note: Ralliement créditiste vote is compared to Social Credit vote in the 1963 election.

	

	

	

Note: Union des électeurs vote is compared to New Democracy vote in 1940 election. Social Credit vote is compared to New Democracy vote in 1940 election. Labour-Progressive vote is compared to Communist vote in 1940 election.

See also
 List of Canadian federal electoral districts
 Past Canadian electoral districts

References

Campaign expense data from Elections Canada
Riding history for Hull from the Library of Parliament
Riding history for Hull—Aylmer from the Library of Parliament

Notes

Politics of Gatineau
Quebec federal electoral districts
1914 establishments in Quebec